The dragon poacher (Percis japonica) is a fish in the family Agonidae. It was described by Peter Simon Pallas in 1769, originally under the genus Cottus. It is a marine, deep water-dwelling fish which is known from the northern Pacific Ocean, including the Sea of Japan (from which its species epithet is derived), the Sea of Okhotsk, and the Bering Sea.

The dragon poacher's diet consists of benthic crustaceans including shrimp, crabs, amphipods, as well as mysids, oligochaetes, and polychaetes.

References

Dragon poacher
Fish of the Pacific Ocean
Marine fauna of Asia
Fish described in 1769
Taxa named by Peter Simon Pallas